Sphenocrates is a genus of moth in the family Gelechiidae.

Species
 Sphenocrates aulodocha (Meyrick, 1918)
 Sphenocrates neptis Diakonoff, 1954

References

Gelechiidae